Zachary Curtis Lowe (born August 24, 1977) is an American sportswriter, journalist, and podcaster. After starting his journalistic career covering the criminal justice system in his home state of Connecticut, Lowe transitioned to basketball reporting and is today considered one of the premier columnists covering the NBA.

Education
Lowe is an alumnus of Greenwich High School in Connecticut, and is a 1999 graduate of Dartmouth College.  He spent two years teaching at Cresskill High School in New Jersey before pursuing a MA in U.S. History (with a thesis on the post-Civil War Reconstruction) at William & Mary and a MS in Journalism from Columbia School of Journalism.

Career
For nearly four years, beginning in August 2004, Lowe worked as a crime, government, and courts reporter for his local Stamford Advocate; then spent two years with The American Lawyer. During that time, he also wrote part-time for the fan-blog CelticsHub.Com.  Lowe claims his analytics-based approach to sports-writing is owed to Rob Neyer and John Hollinger, but he attributes his journalism skills to his beat-writer days.

In 2010, he started running the "Point Forward" NBA column-blog on Sports Illustrated.  In 2012, Lowe was hired by Bill Simmons to join Grantland as an NBA analyst. In 2015, after the closing of Grantland, his contract was picked up by Grantland's parent company, ESPN. In 2016, Lowe was pursued by Bleacher Report but ultimately re-signed with ESPN on a multi-year contract.

Lowe hosts a weekly podcast called "The Lowe Post", which features mainly casual chats with other journalists, players, or coaches/GMs about the NBA.  He also writes a weekly NBA article during the season for ESPN headlined as "Ten Things I Like And Don't Like, Including...".

Lowe moderated the 2016 Basketball Analytics panel of the MIT-Sloan Sports Analytics Conference.

Writing style 
Lowe is known for his detailed posts on basketball, use of video clips, and clear writing style.  He writes about the entire NBA, unlike many sportswriters who are concerned about a single team.  Lowe has cited his early-career work as a court reporter for his evidence-bias and balanced approach.

In 2013, Will Leitch called Lowe "one of the best basketball writers working right now" and "certainly the most interesting." Josh Levin, writing in Slate, called Lowe "America's best sports writer."

Personal
Lowe is married to Croatian international media consultant Vesna Jaksic, whom he met when both worked for the Stamford Advocate.  They have a daughter and reside in Connecticut.

References

American sportswriters
Dartmouth College alumni
College of William & Mary alumni
Columbia University Graduate School of Journalism alumni
Living people
1977 births
American podcasters
Greenwich High School alumni